The Solla-Carcaba Cigar Factory (also known as the Pamies-Arango Cigar Factory) is the last standing historic cigar factory in the Lincolnville Historic District. The building is located at 88 Riberia Street in St. Augustine, Florida and was added to the U.S. National Register of Historic Places on May 6, 1993. Current owners, Vista Hotels VIII, Inc., and its principal, Kanti Patel, are in the process of converting the building from its current use as professional office space to a Hilton-branded boutique hotel to be named, "The Factory."

References

External links
 Historic City News, Lincolnville Historic District source for local news and information. Located in the Solla-Carcaba Cigar Factory
 St. Johns County listings at National Register of Historic Places
 Florida's Office of Cultural and Historical Programs
 St. Johns County listings  at Florida's Office of Cultural and Historical Programs
 Solla-Carcaba Cigar Factory

Gallery

Historic cigar factories
National Register of Historic Places in St. Johns County, Florida
Buildings and structures in St. Augustine, Florida
Industrial buildings and structures on the National Register of Historic Places in Florida
Tobacco buildings in the United States